Gary Lee Stevens (born August 21, 1941, in McMinnville, Oregon) is a Republican member of the Alaska Senate, representing the P District since his appointment in February 2003. He was previously a member of the Alaska House of Representatives from 2000 through 2003. Stevens was Senate President for four years, from 2009 through 2012, leading a bipartisan coalition of 10 Democrats and six Republicans. He will again serve as Senate President from 2023 onwards, leading a bipartisan coalition of 9 Democrats and 8 Republicans.

References

External links
 Alaska State Legislature – Senator Gary Stevens official government website
 Alaska Senate Majority – Senator Gary Stevens official government website
 Project Vote Smart – Senator Gary Stevens (AK) profile
 Follow the Money – Gary L Stevens
 2006 2004 2002 2000 1996 campaign contributions
 Gary Stevens at 100 Years of Alaska's Legislature

|-

|-

1941 births
21st-century American politicians
Republican Party Alaska state senators
Educators from Alaska
Linfield University alumni
Living people
People from Kodiak, Alaska
People from McMinnville, Oregon
Presidents of the Alaska Senate
Republican Party members of the Alaska House of Representatives
University of Alaska Anchorage people